China's National Highway G010, also called Tongsan Expressway (Tongjiang-Sanya Expressway), was an abolished national highway in China, which ran from Tongjiang in Heilongjiang to Sanya in Hainan.

It passed through the provinces of Heilongjiang, Jilin, Liaoning, Shandong, Jiangsu, Shanghai, Zhejiang, Fujian and Guangdong. At Hai'an in Guangdong, Guangdong–Hainan Railway carries cars by ferry across the Qiongzhou Strait to Haikou in Hainan, before ending in Sanya.

It was part of the five north-south and seven east-west main routes in China. However, it has been abolished in 2010s, now being part of the G15 Shenyang–Haikou Expressway.

See also
 China National Highways
 Expressways of China

References

Transport in Hainan
Transport in Heilongjiang
010
Expressways in China